The 2019–20 PlusLiga was the 84th season of the Polish Volleyball Championship, the 20th season as a professional league organized by the Polish Volleyball League SA under the supervision of the Polish Volleyball Federation.

The season has been cancelled due to the 2020 coronavirus outbreak.

Regular season

Ranking system:
 Points
 Number of victories
 Set ratio
 Setpoint ratio
 H2H results

1st round

2nd round

3rd round

4th round

5th round

6th round

7th round

8th round

9th round

10th round

11th round

12th round

13th round

14th round

15th round

16th round

17th round

18th round

19th round

20th round

21st round

22nd round

23rd round

24th round

25th round

26th round

Final standings

Squads

See also
 2019–20 CEV Champions League
 2019–20 CEV Challenge Cup

References

External links
 Official website 

PlusLiga
Poland
Plusliga
Plusliga
Plusliga
Plusliga
PlusLiga